The manetail snake eel (Ophichthus urolophus) is an eel in the family Ophichthidae (worm/snake eels). It was described by Coenraad Jacob Temminck and Hermann Schlegel in 1846, originally under the genus Conger. It is a marine, tropical eel which is known from the Indo-Pacific. It inhabits deep waters, but is found in muddy sediments in shallow waters on rare occasions.

The manetail snake eel's diet consists of benthic invertebrates.

References

Taxa named by Coenraad Jacob Temminck
Taxa named by Hermann Schlegel
Fish described in 1846
Ophichthus